The Franklin Sound Islands Important Bird Area comprises several small islands, with a collective total area of 1725 ha, lying in Franklin Sound between the much larger Flinders Island to the north and Cape Barren Island to the south, in the Furneaux Group of Tasmania, Australia.

The islands have been identified by BirdLife International as an Important Bird Area (IBA) because they support over 1% of the global populations of the Cape Barren goose, short-tailed shearwater, white-faced storm-petrel, black-faced cormorant, sooty oystercatcher and Pacific gull.

Islands in the Franklin Sound islands IBA include:

Vansittart Island Group
 Vansittart Island
 Ram Island
 Pelican Island

Great Dog Island Group
 Little Dog Island
 Great Dog Island
 Briggs Islet
 Little Green Island
 Spences Reefs

Tin Kettle Island Group
 Anderson Island
 Little Anderson Island
 Mid Woody Islet
 Tin Kettle Island
 Oyster Rocks
 Neds Reef

Long Island Group
 Long Island

References

Furneaux Group
Important Bird Areas of Tasmania